Badillo is a surname of Hispanic origin. The name may refer to:

Atilano Cordero Badillo (born c. 1943), Puerto Rican entrepreneur and supermarket businessman
Arturo Badillo (born 1987), Mexican boxer
Basilio Badillo (1885–1935), Mexican educator and politician; Governor of the Mexican State of Jalisco 1921–22
Herman Badillo (1929–2014), American politician from New York City, U.S. representative 1971–77
Juan B. Fernandez-Badillo (1912–1989), Puerto Rican-born American federal judge
Julio Cesar Badillo (born 1966), American musician in Puerto Rico

Other uses
4866 Badillo, main belt asteroid
Badillo Elementary School

Spanish-language surnames